Tampa Baes is an American reality television series about a group of lesbian friends in Tampa Bay, Florida. It premiered on November 5, 2021, on Amazon Prime Video.

Cast
 Cuppie Bragg
 Marissa Gialousis
 Haley Grable
 Mack McKenzie
 Summer Mitchell
 Olivia Mullins
 Brianna Murphy
 Ali Myers
 Shiva Pishdad
 Melanie Posner
 Nelly Ramirez
 Jordan Whitley

Episodes

Production
The series began filming in March 2021 and wrapped up in June 2021. The show's cast were in the same social circle before filming began. Melissa Bidwell is the showrunner.

Release
The series was announced in July 2021. All eight episodes of the series were released on Prime Video on November 5, 2021.

References

External links 
 

English-language television shows
Amazon Prime Video original programming
2020s American documentary television series
2021 American television series debuts
2020s American LGBT-related television series
American LGBT-related reality television series
Television shows set in Tampa, Florida
Lesbian-related television shows
Television series by Amazon Studios